The enzyme  sirohydrochlorin cobaltochelatase (EC 4.99.1.3) catalyzes the reaction

cobalt-sirohydrochlorin + 2 H+ = sirohydrochlorin + Co2+

In the forward direction of reactions towards cobalamin in anaerobic bacteria, the two substrates of this enzyme are sirohydrochlorin and Co2+; its two products are cobalt-sirohydrochlorin and H+.

This enzyme belongs to the family of lyases, specifically the "catch-all" class of lyases that do not fit into any other sub-class.  The systematic name of this enzyme class is cobalt-sirohydrochlorin cobalt-lyase (sirohydrochlorin-forming). Other names in common use include CbiK, CbiX, CbiXS, anaerobic cobalt chelatase, cobaltochelatase [ambiguous], and sirohydrochlorin cobalt-lyase (incorrect). This enzyme is part of the biosynthetic pathway to cobalamin (vitamin B12) in bacteria such as Salmonella typhimurium and Bacillus megaterium. It has also been identified as the enzyme which inserts nickel into sirohydrochlorin in the biosynthesis of cofactor F430, reaction .

See also
 Cobalamin biosynthesis

Structural studies

References

Further reading 

 
 
 

EC 4.99.1
Enzymes of known structure